The GP Betonexpressz 2000 is a European bicycle race held in the Jász-Nagykun-Szolnok County, Hungary. Since 2009, the race has been organised as a 1.2 event on the UCI Europe Tour.

Winners

UCI Europe Tour races
Cycle races in Hungary
Recurring sporting events established in 2007
2007 establishments in Hungary
Summer events in Hungary